The Living Enz was the first live album released by New Zealand rock band Split Enz. Primarily recorded in Melbourne, Australia during the band's 1984 Enz with a Bang farewell tour, it also includes some material from the Auckland shows of that tour, plus recordings from the band's 1982 Time and Tide tour.

Track listing
Disc 1
 "I Walk Away" (Neil Finn) – 4:43
 "One Step Ahead" (N. Finn) – 3:34
 "Bold as Brass" (Tim Finn, Robert Gillies) – 5:34
 "Ninnie Knees Up" (Noel Crombie) – 3:39
 "I See Red" (T. Finn) – 4:15
 "Message to My Girl" (N. Finn) – 4:27
 "I Hope I Never" (T. Finn) – 4:52
 "Dirty Creature" (T. Finn, Nigel Griggs, N. Finn) – 5:57
 "Hard Act to Follow" (T. Finn) – 3:08
 "Time for a Change" (Phil Judd) – 3:57

Disc 2
 "Strait Old Line" (N. Finn) – 4:16
 "Walking Through the Ruins" (T. Finn) – 6:41
 "Pioneer" (Eddie Rayner) – 2:01
 "Six Months in a Leaky Boat" (T. Finn, Split Enz) – 5:23
 "Take a Walk" (N. Finn) – 4:20
 "Small World" (T. Finn) – 4:57
 "Lost for Words" (T. Finn, Griggs) – 3:42
 "Years Go By" (N. Finn, Rayner) – 4:17
 "Charlie" (T. Finn) – 5:47

Personnel
Tim Finn: vocals & keyboards
Neil Finn: guitar & vocals
Eddie Rayner: keyboards
Noel Crombie: percussion & drums (Lead vocals on "Ninnie Knees Up") (guitar freak out)
Nigel Griggs: bass guitar
Paul Hester: drums & vocals (on all tracks except CD 2 tracks 5, 6 & 7)

Production
Produced by Eddie Rayner & Nigel Griggs

CD 1
Recorded at Festival Hall, Melbourne, Australia, November 1984

CD 2
Tracks 1, 2 & 3
Recorded at Festival Hall, Melbourne, Australia, November 1984

Tracks 5, 6 & 7
Recorded at Capitol Theatre, Sydney, Australia, July 1982

Tracks 4, 8 & 9
Recorded at Logan Campbell Centre, Auckland, New Zealand, December 1984

Charts

Certifications

References

Mushroom Records live albums
1985 live albums
Live albums by New Zealand artists
Live albums by Australian artists
Split Enz live albums